Fry's Planet Word is a documentary series about language. Written and presented by Stephen Fry, five hour-long episodes were first broadcast in September and October 2011 on BBC Two and BBC HD. The series was produced and directed by John-Paul Davidson who worked with Fry on two other documentaries: Stephen Fry In America (2008) and Last Chance to See (2009). There is a book to accompany the series published by Michael Joseph, an imprint of Penguin Group.

Episodes

"Babel"
Focusing on the origins of language with topics covered including:
The Max Planck Institute for Evolutionary Anthropology and communication between primates
The Turkana language
The FOXP2 gene and its effect on language
Brain patterns from an MRI scan while talking
Victor of Aveyron, feral children, and language acquisition (discussion with psycholinguist Steven Pinker)
The wug test by Jean Berko Gleason
The Klingon language and how d'Armond Speers taught it as the first language to his son
Sign language
The Tower of Babel
Philology, the Proto-Indo-European language, and Grimm's law
Working languages and official languages of the United Nations

"Identity"
Focusing on how one identifies through language
Regional accents of English through Yorkshire and Newcastle upon Tyne (discussion with poet Ian McMillan)
Multilingualism
Jewish humour and the Yiddish language (Discussion with comedians Ari Teman and Stewie Stone at The Friar's Club)
Language death and globalisation
Irish language and the Connacht Irish dialect on Ros na Rún
Basque language and cuisine
The loss of the Occitan language and its Provençal dialect
The Académie française and inventing new French words
The Maghreb French dialect's effect on standard French
Israel and the revival of the Hebrew language as a modern language (discussion with linguist Ghil'ad Zuckermann)
Kenya's Turkana people and the use of English, Swahili, and Turkana

"Uses and Abuses"
The evolution of slang and profanity
Common sources of obscenities in the Turkana and English languages
"Fuck", Tourette syndrome, and coprolalia
Swearing and the basal ganglia
Brian Blessed, the Stroop effect, and the hypoalgesic effect of swearing
The Thick of It and Armando Iannucci
The ban of Lady Chatterley's Lover
Stephen K. Amos and racial and sexual epithets
Euphemisms and weasel words
Omid Djalili and the Persian politeness of taarof
Euphemism and dysphemism in the hospital
Polari in Round the Horne
Teenagers and slang at Berkeley High School
Hip hop and popular media on the growth of language
El Général and the Tunisian revolution

"Spreading the Word"
The history of written language, from the earliest writing to blogging and tweeting
The Akha people of Thailand who have no written language
Cuneiform, the history of bureaucracy, and the Epic of Gilgamesh
Egyptian hieroglyphs and the Rosetta Stone
Classical Greece, Homer, the Phoenicians, and the alphabet
Jerusalem, the Western Wall, and the resilience of Judaism by means of the Hebrew alphabet
The Dome of the Rock and the spread of the Arabic script with Islam
The Dead Sea Scrolls and the oldest record of the Ten Commandments
Printing and its roots in China
The complexities of Written Chinese with David Tang and Johnson Chang
The development of pinyin during the Cultural Revolution
Typography, the development of the book, Geoffrey Chaucer, and the standardisation of the English language
The democratisation of reading, the Age of Enlightenment, and Denis Diderot's Encyclopédie
The Bodleian Library and the digitisation of information
Jimmy Wales and the Wikipedia project
Social media and the Arab Spring
Belle de Jour and the lure of blogging
Hanif Kureishi and the evolution of the book, Robert Coover and electronic literature, and the researchers at the MIT Media Lab

"The Power and the Glory"
The influence of storytelling and literature on language
The Turkana people and their rivalry with the Toposa people
Plot with William Goldman and his Marathon Man
Homer's Odyssey and Iliad
James Joyce's Ulysses with David Norris
J. R. R. Tolkien's The Hobbit and The Lord of the Rings and the works of Stephen King with Peter Jackson
William Shakespeare and the emphasis on character
Hamlet with Simon Russell Beale, David Tennant, Brian Blessed, and Mark Rylance
Shakespeare in French with Guillaume Gallienne of the Comédie-Française and in Mandarin Chinese with David Tang and Johnson Chang
P. G. Wodehouse with Robert McCrum
George Orwell's Nineteen Eighty-Four, its Newspeak, and business speak with Ian Hislop
W. H. Auden's "Funeral Blues", Four Weddings and a Funeral, and Coldplay's "Fix You" with Richard Curtis
Bob Dylan's music with Christopher Ricks

International broadcast
In Australia, this programme was shown on ABC1 at 9:30pm on Sundays from 11 March 2012.

References

External links

Stephen Fry's Planet Word, BBC Two, review at The Telegraph
The Weekend's TV: Fry's Planet Word, Sun, BBC2 at The Independent

2011 British television series debuts
2011 British television series endings
BBC high definition shows
BBC television documentaries
Stephen Fry
English-language television shows
Television series about language